The Shungura Formation is a stratigraphic formation located in the Omo river basin in Ethiopia. It dates to the Late Pliocene to Early Pleistocene. Oldowan tools have been found in the formation, suggesting early use of stone tools by hominins. Among many others, fossils of Panthera were found in Member G of the formation.

Geology 
The formation comprises sandstones, siltstones, claystones and tuff, deposited in a fluvial to deltaic lacustrine environment.

Paleobiota

Fossil content 
Among many others, the following fossils have been reported from the formation:

Mammals 

Chiroptera

 Hipposideros
 H. kaumbului
 Taphozous
 T. abitus

Rodents

 Aethomys deheinzelini
 Arvicanthis sp.
 Acomys sp.
 Gerbillus sp.
 Heterocephalus atikoi
 Jaculus orientalis
 Mastomys minor
 Paraxerus ochraceus
 Pelomys sp.
 Saidomys sp.
 Tatera sp.
 Xerus sp.

Lagomorphs

 Lepus capensis

Eulipotyphla

 Crocidura aithiops

Perissodactyls

Chalicotheres 

 Ancylotherium hennigi

Rhinocerotidae

 Ceratotherium simum
 Diceros bicornis

Equidae

 Equus oldowayensis
 Eurygnathohippus libycum
 Hipparion sitifense

Artiodactyls

Bovids

 Aepyceros shungurae
 Antidorcas recki
 Gazella praethomsoni
 Kobus 
 K. ancystrocera
 K. ellipsiprymnus
 K. oricornis
 K. sigmoidalis
 Megalotragus sp.
 Menelikia lyrocera
 Pelorovis sp.
 Redunca sp.
 Syncerus cf. acoelotus 
 Tragelaphus
 T. gaudryi
 T. nakuae

Camelids

 Camelops grattardi
 Camelus sp.

Hippopotamidae 

 Hexaprotodon
 H. protoamphibius
 H. shungurensis
 Hippopotamus protoamphibius

Suids 

 Kolpochoerus limnetes
 Metridiochoerus
 M. jacksoni
 M. modestus
 Notochoerus
 N. euilus
 N. scotti
 Nyanzachoerus kanamensis

Carnivora 

 Enhydriodon omoensis
 Dinofelis sp.
 Helogale hirtula
 Homotherium aethiopicum

Hyracoidea

 Gigantohyrax maguirei

Proboscideans 

 Loxodonta
 L. adaurora
 L. exoptata
 Palaeoloxodon recki

Primates
Cercopithecidae

 Dinopithecus sp.
 Paracolobus mutiwa
 Rhinocolobus turkanaensis
 Theropithecus
 T. brumpti
 T. oswaldi

Hominins

 Australopithecus sp.
 Paranthropus
 P. aethiopicus
 P. boisei

Reptiles

Euthecodon Brumpti

Fish

 Auchenoglanis sp.
 Clarias sp.
 Gymnarchus sp.
 Polypterus
 Polypterus bichir
 Sindacharax
 S. greenwoodi
 S. omoensis
 Synodontis
 S. frontosus
 S. schall

See also 

 List of fossil sites
 List of fossiliferous stratigraphic units in Ethiopia
 Geology of Ethiopia

References

Bibliography

Further reading 
 L. Bobe and M. Mabela. 1997. Incidence of four gastrointestinal parasite worms in the group of cricetomas, Lukaya-Democratic Republic of Congo. Tropicultura 15(3):132-135
 C. S. Churcher and D. A. Hooijer. 1980. The Olduvai Zebra (Equus oldowayensis) from the later Omo beds, Ethiopia. Zoologische Mededelingen 55(22):265-280
 Y. Coppens and F. C. Howell. 1985. Les Faunes Plio-Pleistocenes de las Basse Vallee de l'Omo (Ethiopie), Tome 1: Perissodactyls, Artiodactyls (Bovidae). Cahiers de Paleontologie, Editions du CNRS, Paris
 G. Eck. 1977. Diversity and frequency distributions of Omo Group Cercopithecidae. Journal of Human Evolution 6:55-63
 C. S. Feibel, F.H. Brown, and I. McDougall. 1989. Stratigraphic Context of Fossil hominids from the Omo Group Deposits: Northern Turkana Basin, Kenya and Ethiopia. American Journal of Physical Anthropology 78:595-622
 J. de Heinzelin. 1983. The Omo Group: Archives of the International Omo Research Expedition. Musee Royal de l'Afrique Centrale, Annales Series 8, Tervuren, Belgique 85
 F. C. Howell and Y. Coppens. 1973. Inventory of remains of Hominidae from Pliocene and Pleistocene formations of the lower Omo Basin, Ethiopia (1967-1972). American Journal of Physical Anthropology 40:1-16
 M. G. Leakey. 1982. Extinct large Colobines from the Plio-Pleistocene of Africa. American Journal of Physical Anthropology 58:153-172
 2015 - Thomas W. Plummer, Joseph V. Ferraro, Julien Louys, Fritz Hertel, Zeresenay Alemseged, René Bobe, L. C. Bishop - Bovid ecomorphology and hominin paleoenvironments of the Shungura Formation, lower Omo River Valley, Ethiopia
 1979 - Robert J. Rogers & Francis H. Brown - Authigenic mitridatite from the Shungura Formation, southwestern Ethiopia
 G. Suwa, T. D. White, and F. Clark Howell. 1996. Mandibular postcanine dentition from the Shungura Formation, Ethiopia: Crown morphology, taxonomic allocations and Plio-Pleistocene Hominid Evolution. American Journal of Physical Anthropology 101:247-282
  (1993); Wildlife of Gondwana. Reed. 
 H. B. Wesselman. 1984. The Omo Micromammals: Systematics and Paleoecology of Early Man Sites from Ethiopia. Contributions to Vertebrate Evolution 17

Geologic formations of Ethiopia
Pliocene Series of Africa
Pleistocene Series of Africa
Sandstone formations
Siltstone formations
Shale formations
Tuff formations
Deltaic deposits
Fluvial deposits
Lacustrine deposits
Fossiliferous stratigraphic units of Africa
Paleontology in Ethiopia